Dilbagh Singh Athwal (12 October 1928 – 14 May 2017) was an Indian-American geneticist, plant breeder and agriculturist, known to have conducted pioneering research in plant breeding. He was a professor and the Head of the Department of Plant Breeding at Punjab Agricultural University and an associate of Norman Borlaug, the renowned biologist and Nobel Laureate, with whom he has collaborated for the introduction of high-yielding dwarf varieties of wheat. 

Popularly known as Father of Wheat Revolution, he was instrumental in developing ‘PV 18’ in 1966 and the most popular amber grained wheat variety ‘Kalyansona’ in 1967. In 1967, he joined International Rice Research Institute's management team and ultimately served as the Institute's first deputy director general. His research has also returned several innovations in rice breeding and his body of work has been documented in a number of books and articles published in peer reviewed journals. The University of Sydney conferred the degree of Doctor of Philosophy on him in 1955 for his contributions to agriculture and, in 1964, he received Shanti Swarup Bhatnagar Prize of the Council of Scientific and Industrial Research, the highest Indian award in the Science category. The Government of India awarded him the third highest civilian honour of the Padma Bhushan, in 1975, for his contributions to biological science.

He died in New Jersey on 14 May 2017.

See also 

 Punjab Agricultural University
 Norman Borlaug
 International Rice Research Institute

References 

1928 births
2017 deaths
Recipients of the Padma Bhushan in science & engineering
Recipients of the Shanti Swarup Bhatnagar Award in Biological Science
Indian agriculturalists
Indian geneticists
Plant breeding
Indian botanical writers
American botanical writers
American agriculturalists
American geneticists
Academic staff of Punjab Agricultural University
Indian emigrants to the United States
20th-century Indian biologists
20th-century American biologists